("customs and traditions"; literally, "uses and customs") is the indigenous customary law in Hispanic America. Since the era of Spanish colonialism, authorities have recognized local forms of rulership, self governance, and juridical practice, with varying degrees of acceptance and formality. The term is often used in English without translation.

 political mechanisms are used by numerous indigenous peoples in Mexico, Guatemala, Bolivia, and other countries to govern water rights, in criminal and civil conflicts, and to elect their representatives to regional and national bodies.

Under Spanish colonial rule
Spanish colonial authorities in the Americas were ordered to investigate the traditions and customs of indigenous communities, and to apply these traditions to disputes among Indian subjects. Scholar José Rabasa traces the term  to the New Laws of 1542, which ordered traditional procedures be used in dealings with Indians rather than "ordinary" Spanish legal proceedings. The division of legal authority is associated with notion of a Republic of Indians subject to distinct legal norms under Spanish colonial rule. According to Rabasa, this division "at once protects Indian communities from Spaniards, criollos, and mestizos, and alienates Indians in a separate republic, in a structure not unlike apartheid."

North America

Mexico
In Mexico,  practices are widely used by indigenous communities and are officially recognized in the states of Oaxaca (for 417 of 570 municipalities), Sonora, and Chiapas.

Central America

Guatemala
In Guatemala, Maya communities have used a variety of community-oriented or informal mechanisms for conflict resolution.

South America

Bolivia
In Bolivia, indigenous norms for self-governance, justice, and administration of territory are extensively recognized by the 2009 Constitution, which defines the country as plurinational. This recognition builds on earlier incorporation of indigenous customary law into the Bolivian legal system. In eight of the country's nine departments, minority indigenous peoples (and in La Paz, Afro-Bolivians) elect representatives to the Departmental Assembly through customary procedures.

TCOs are being included under the Indigenous-Origin Campesino Autonomy regime. The eleven municipalities also under this regime may choose to use  for their internal governance.

Colombia

See also
 Custom (law)

References

Indigenous politics in the Americas
Law of Spain